Bewafai is a 1985 Hindi film starring Rajesh Khanna and Rajinikanth. The film was directed by R. Thyagarajan. Bewafai  grossed Rs 11.95 crore at the box office in 1985. The film was a box office success.

Plot
Asha has been in love with Ashok since her childhood. But somehow she was never able to convey her feelings for him throughout her childhood and college days. Now Ashok works as an employee of her father Diwan Sardarilal. She becomes very possessive about him to the point where she cannot stand the thought of another woman then trying to woo him. The possessiveness becomes so strong that Asha beats up a woman Vinny over Ashok. She tries to be aware of Ashok's whereabouts. Renu falls in love with Ashok, breaking Asha heart. She learns that Ashok has long taken care of Renu. Asha decides to meet Renu to teach her a lesson but when she finds that Renu is a mental patient and Ashok has been nursing her, she changes her heart and begins to assist Ashok in doing service to the mentally imbalanced Renu. Their lives take an unexpected turn when Ranveer shoots Ashok and leaves him mortally wounded.

Cast

Rajesh Khanna as Ashok 
Rajinikanth as Ranveer
Tina Munim as Asha
Padmini Kolhapure as Renu
Meenakshi Seshadri as Vinny
Pran as Diwan Sardarilal
A. K. Hangal as Hariharnath
Urmila Bhatt as Mrs. Hariharnath
Vijay Arora as Doctor
Guddi Maruti as Guddi
Gurubachan Singh as Ranga

Music

References

External links
 

1985 films
1985 romantic drama films
Indian buddy films
Indian romantic drama films
Buddy drama films
1980s Hindi-language films
Films scored by Bappi Lahiri
Films directed by R. Thyagarajan (director)